Mostragee is a townland of 300 acres in County Antrim, Northern Ireland. It is situated in the civil parish of Derrykeighan and historic barony of Dunluce Lower.

See also 
List of townlands in County Antrim

References

Townlands of County Antrim
Civil parish of Derrykeighan